Broadus Airport  is a county-owned, public-use airport located  northwest of the central business district of Broadus, a town in Powder River County, Montana, United States. This new airport was built at a cost of $2 million to replace the old Broadus Airport which is now closed.

Facilities and aircraft 
For the 12-month period ending July 11, 2006, the airport had 5,350 aircraft operations, an average of 14 per day: 98% general aviation and 2% air taxi.

Old airport 
The old Broadus Airport  was located at coordinates .

References

External links 

Airports in Montana
Buildings and structures in Powder River County, Montana
Transportation in Powder River County, Montana